Goolag may refer to:

A nickname for Google
Cult of the Dead Cow, Goolag campaign
 A PHP application designed to operate Google Desktop Search
 Goolag, Iran, a village in South Khorasan Province, Iran
The Gulag, the Soviet Union's labor camp government.

See also 
 Gulag (disambiguation)